George Able Sprague (November 30, 1871 – November 8, 1963), businessman, was mayor of Dallas in 1935–1937.

Biography
George Able Sprague was born on November 30, 1871 in Preston, Fillmore County, Minnesota to Isaac Sprague and Anna Jeannette Plummer. He married Minna Schwartz, daughter of Ernest O. Schwartz and Elizabeth Gossman, on December 25, 1900 Preston, Fillmore, Minnesota.  They had eight children: George S., Mortimer L., Elizabeth, Wilma, Howard Isaac, John F., Natalie, and Charles Cameron.

In Fillmore County, Minnesota, George Sprague taught school, operated a general store and was postmaster. As a traveling salesman, he came to Dallas where he eventually settled. He later managed a warehouse.  He was active in the Oak Cliff area of Dallas and was active in the Oak Cliff Dads Club. He was involved in the formation of a Central Dads Club and headed it in its first year. His sons were noted for their skills in football at the collegiate level bringing recognition to Dallas.

He was elected to the city council in 1936 and 1937; and as mayor in 1937. In the 1937 city council election, George Sprague received the largest number of votes citywide.  The city council then selected him as its mayor. During his time as mayor, Sprague supported the merger of Dallas, University Park and Highland Park and the election of the mayor by the citizens instead of the city council. The Dallas School Board named its new football stadium in southwest Dallas "Sprague Field" in honor of the family.

George Able Sprague died November 8, 1963 in Dallas, Texas and was interred at the Oak Cliff Cemetery, Dallas.

References

1871 births
1963 deaths
Mayors of Dallas
People from Oak Cliff, Texas